Raves is a commune in the Vosges department in Grand Est in northeastern France.

History
The earliest surviving record of the village comes from a document of 1329 in which it is called Rayves.

Raves during the ancien regime period fell under the bailiwick of Saint-Dié. There is a small chapel in the village dedicated to St Stephen, but there is no church:  for Mass, the commune shares the church at Bertrimoutier.   The presbytery and the cemetery are shared in the same way as, until the end of the nineteenth century, was the school.

Under the administrative settlement established after the French revolution, the commune came under the canton of Bertrimoutier.   The present administrative framework is based on the one established some ten years later under Napoleon I.

See also
Communes of the Vosges department

References

Communes of Vosges (department)